Morkhana is a village in Nokha Tehsil in the Bikaner district of the Indian state of Rajasthan.

Geography 
Morkhana is about 284 kilometers from the state capital of Jaipur.

Temple

Morkhana is famous for its Suswani Devi temple, dedicated to the Goddess Suswani Mata. The temple is around 846 years old. It is constructed out of Jaisalmer stones where statues of demigods are carved on the outer walls.

References

Villages in Bikaner district